Unification Day may refer to:
 Unification Day (Bulgaria)
 Unification Day (Cameroon)
 German Unity Day
 Unification Day (Italy)
 Union Day (Myanmar)
 Great Union Day (Romania)
 Unification Day (Ukraine)